Fish Rock (formerly, Fishrock and Conways Landing) is an unincorporated community in Mendocino County, California.

The Conways Landing post office opened in 1870, changed its name to Fish Rock in 1871, closed in 1873, re-opened in 1885, moved in 1908, and closed for good in 1910.

References

Unincorporated communities in California
Unincorporated communities in Mendocino County, California
Populated coastal places in California